Simo Krunić (Serbian Cyrillic: Симо Крунић; born 13 January 1967) is a Bosnian-Serbian professional football manager and former footballer. He is currently the coach of OFK Beograd.

Playing career
In the late 1980s, Krunić played for the two biggest clubs in Bosnia and Herzegovina, Sarajevo and Željezničar, while the teams competed in the Yugoslav First League. In between the two clubs, he also played for Famos Hrasnica. He subsequently moved to OFK Beograd due to the outbreak of the Bosnian War, spending two seasons with the Romantičari (1992–1994).

During his footballing career, Krunić also played professionally in Spain, South Korea (he won the 1996 Korean FA Cup with Pohang Steelers) and Greece.

Managerial career
Together with Risto Vidaković, Krunić served as assistant to Spaniard Javier Clemente at the helm of the Serbia national team during the UEFA Euro 2008 qualifying. He was later manager of BASK, Željezničar, OFK Beograd, Čukarički, Inđija, Jagodina (on two occasions), Dalian Yifang and Radnik Surdulica. In May 2013, he won the 2012–13 Serbian Cup with Jagodina.

In May 2018, Krunić for a second time in his career took over the managerial job of Čukarički. Krunić had success with Čukarički, getting the club to 4th place in the 2018–19 Serbian SuperLiga and also qualifying it to the 2019–20 UEFA Europa League qualifying rounds. He decided to leave Čukarički on 25 May 2019.

On 11 February 2019, it was announced that Krunić became a new member of the Serbia national team coaching staff and was appointed as a coach. He left the national team later that day.

On 25 June 2019, he became the new manager of Radnički Niš, succeeding Nenad Lalatović on the position. He was sacked in August 2019, but shortly after in October, returned to manage Radnik Surdulica.

Honours

Player
Pohang Stellers
Korean FA Cup: 1996

Manager
Jagodina 
 Serbian Cup: 2012–13

References

External links

Srbijafudbal profile

1967 births
Living people
Footballers from Sarajevo
Serbs of Bosnia and Herzegovina
Association football midfielders
Yugoslav footballers
Bosnia and Herzegovina footballers
FK Sarajevo players
FK Famos Hrasnica players
FK Željezničar Sarajevo players
OFK Beograd players
CA Marbella footballers
Pohang Steelers players
FK Čukarički players
Athlitiki Enosi Larissa F.C. players
ILTEX Lykoi F.C. players
Panetolikos F.C. players
Yugoslav First League players
First League of Serbia and Montenegro players
Segunda División players
K League 1 players
Football League (Greece) players
Bosnia and Herzegovina expatriate footballers
Expatriate footballers in Spain
Bosnia and Herzegovina expatriate sportspeople in Spain
Expatriate footballers in South Korea
Bosnia and Herzegovina expatriate sportspeople in South Korea
Expatriate footballers in Greece
Bosnia and Herzegovina expatriate sportspeople in Greece
Bosnia and Herzegovina football managers
FK Željezničar Sarajevo managers
OFK Beograd managers
FK Čukarički managers
FK Inđija managers
FK Jagodina managers
Dalian Professional F.C. managers
FK Radnički Niš managers
FK Radnik Surdulica managers
Premier League of Bosnia and Herzegovina managers
Serbian SuperLiga managers
Chinese Super League managers
Bosnia and Herzegovina expatriate football managers
Expatriate football managers in Serbia
Bosnia and Herzegovina expatriate sportspeople in Serbia
Expatriate football managers in China
Bosnia and Herzegovina expatriate sportspeople in China